Long-tailed bat may refer to:

New Zealand long-tailed bat (Chalinolobus tuberculatus)
Myotis frater from Central and East Asia
Choeroniscus (several species) from Central and South America
Rhinopoma (several species) from Africa and Asia

Animal common name disambiguation pages